Holling may refer to:

 Holling (surname)
 Holling Vincoeur, fictional character in the 1990s television show Northern Exposure
 Holling Hoodhood, fictional character in the 2007 children's historical novel The Wednesday Wars by Gary D. Schmidt
 Holling, Moselle, commune in France

See also
 
 
 Hollings
 Holly, origin of "holling"
 Hollingshead (disambiguation)
 Hollingsworth
 Holl (disambiguation)